Marion County Courthouse or Old Marion County Courthouse may refer to:

Marion County Courthouse (Arkansas), Yellville, Arkansas
Marion County Courthouse (Georgia), Buena Vista, Georgia
Old Marion County Courthouse (Georgia), Tazewell, Georgia
Marion County Courthouse (Illinois), Salem, Illinois
Marion County Courthouse (Iowa), Knoxville, Iowa
Marion County Courthouse (Indiana), Marion County, Indiana, the tallest building in Indianapolis until 1962
Marion County Courthouse (Kansas), Marion, Kansas
Marion County Courthouse, located in the Lebanon Historic Commercial District, Lebanon, Kentucky
Marion County Courthouse and Jail, Columbia, Mississippi, listed on the National Register of Historic Places
Marion County Courthouse (Missouri), Hannibal, Missouri
Marion County Courthouse (Ohio), Marion, Ohio
Marion County Courthouse (Oregon), Salem, Oregon
Marion County Courthouse (Texas), Jefferson, Texas, a Recorded Texas Historic Landmark
Marion County Courthouse (West Virginia), Fairmount, West Virginia